

Operation FS was the Imperial Japanese plan to invade and occupy Fiji, American Samoa, Samoa, and New Caledonia in the south Pacific during the Pacific conflict of World War II. The operation was set to be executed in July or August 1942 following Operation MO, Operation RY, and Operation MI.

FS was to be a joint effort between the Imperial Japanese Navy and the Imperial Japanese Army. The primary goal of Operation FS was to, following the completion of MO, RY, and MI, cut the supply and communication lines between Australia and the United States, with the goal of reducing or eliminating Australia as a base to threaten Japan's perimeter defenses in the South Pacific.

Operation FS was postponed following the Japanese setback at the Battle of the Coral Sea, then cancelled after the Japanese defeat at the Battle of Midway, following the losses of four Japanese fleet carriers. The land forces originally dedicated for Operation FS, namely the 17th Army, were instead reassigned to a subsequently unsuccessful reattempt to take Port Moresby, part of the original goal for Operation MO, and to defend the Solomon Islands from Allied offensives.

See also 
 Proposed Japanese invasion of Australia during World War II

Bibliography

Books

Web 

1942 in Japan
Cancelled military operations of World War II
Pacific Ocean theatre of World War II
Pacific theatre of World War II
World War II operations and battles of the Pacific theatre